New York State Route 44 may refer to:

New York State Route 44 (1920s–1930) in the Southern Tier and Central New York
New York State Route 44 (1930–1935) in the Finger Lakes region
U.S. Route 44 in New York, the only route numbered "44" in New York since the mid-1930s